Bob Bryan and Mike Bryan were the defending champions but decided to participate at Valencia instead.
Michaël Llodra and Nenad Zimonjić won the title, defeating Max Mirnyi and Daniel Nestor in the final.

Seeds

Draw

Draw

References
 Main Draw

Davidoff Swiss Indoors - Doubles